Agrasen was a legendary Indian king of Agroha, a city of traders. He is credited with the establishment of a kingdom of traders in North India named Agroha, and is known for his compassion in refusing to slaughter animals in yajnas. On suggestion of goddess Mahalakshmi he gave up Kshatriya tradition and opted Vaishya tradition and she also gave her words of bestowing prosperity there for him and his descendants.

The Government of India issued a postage stamp in honour of Agrasen in 1976.

Origin of the legend 

The Agrasen legend can be traced to Agarwalon ki Utpatti ("Origin of the Agarawals and Agrahari"), an 1871 essay written by Bharatendu Harishchandra (1850-1885), a noted Agrawal author and poet. He claimed to have compiled the legend from "tradition" and "ancient writings", especially a text called Sri Mahalakshmi Vrat Ki Katha. He stated that Sri Mahalakshmi Vrat Ki Katha was contained in the Bhavishya Purana, which exists in several recensions. However, independent researchers have been unable to find the legend in any version of Bhavishya Purana.

In 1976, the Agrawal historian Satyaketu Vidyalankar published a copy of the Mahalakshmi Vrat Ki Katha in his Agrwal Jati Ka Prachin Itihas ("Ancient History of the Agrawal caste"). He stated that he had found this copy in the personal library of Bharatendu Harishchandra. However, the text does not contain any clue about its origin.

Agrawal gotras 

According to Bharatendu Harishchandra's narrative, the Agrawals are divided into seventeen and a half gotras (exogamous clans), which came into being from seventeen and a half sacrifices performed by Agrasen. The last sacrifice is considered "half" because it was abandoned after Agrasen expressed remorse for the violent animal sacrifices. Bharatendu also mentions that Agrasen had 17 queens and a junior queen, but does not mention any connection between these queens and the formation of the gotras. Neither does he explain how sacrifices led to the formation of the gotras.

Historically, there has been no unanimity regarding number and names of these seventeen and a half gotras, and there are regional differences between the list of gotras. In 1983, The Akhil Bhartiya Agrawal Sammelan, a major organization of Agrawals, created a standardized list of gotras by vote, but this list has been controversial.

See also
 Agrasen Jayanti
 Agrasen ki Baoli

References

Bibliography

External links
Maharaja Agrasen at agrasen.com

Characters in Hindu mythology
People from Hisar district